This page is a list of counts van Bergh:

House of Monte
c. 1100-c. 1140: Constantinus de Monte
c. 1140-c. 1190: Rabodo I
c. 1190-c. 1220: Rabodo II
c. 1220- 1260: Hendrik
1260-1290: Adam I
1290-1300: Frederik I
1300-1325: Adam II
1325-1340: Frederik II
1340-1360: Adam III
1360-1400: Willem I
1400-1416: Frederik III

House of Van der Leck
1416-1441: Otto van der Leck
1441-1465: Willem II
1465-1506: Oswald I
1506-1511: Willem III
1511/24-546: Oswald II
1546-1586: Willem IV
1573-1638: Hendrik
1586-1611: Herman
1611-1656: Albert
1656-1712: Oswald III

House of Hohenzollern-Bergh
1712-1737: Frans Willem
1737-1781: Johan Baptist, nicknamed "the Mad Count"
1781-1787: Johanna Josephina

House of Hohenzollern-Sigmaringen
1769-1785: Karel Frederik
1785-1831: Anton Aloysius
1831-1848: Karel
1848-1885: Karel Anton
1885-1905: Leopold
1905-1913: Willem

Willem sold the Huis Bergh in 1913 to Jan Herman van Heek.

See also 
 Land van den Bergh

References

Bergh